Rabenstein Castle is a ruined rock castle in Carinthia, Austria. Rabenstein Castle was built around 1100 to protect nearby Sankt Paul im Lavanttal.

History
Rabenstein Castle began as a mere watchtower built on a tall hill. Rabenstein became a castle when Engelbert I Sponheim, Margrave of Istria founded St. Paul's Abbey in 1091 in order to protect the abbey and town around it.

The castle was occupied by the Rabensteins (whose name henceforth stuck to the structure) until 1200, the Archbishop of Salzburg until 1300,

See also
List of castles in Austria
Saint Paul's Abbey, Lavanttal

References

Castles in Carinthia (state)